Heinrich is a small lunar impact crater on the Mare Imbrium, a lunar mare in the northwest quadrant of the Moon's near side. It was named after Czechoslovakian astronomer . It is a circular, bowl-shaped formation very similar to many other craters of comparable size on the Moon.

Heinrich lies to the southwest of the prominent crater Timocharis, and was previously designated as Timocharis A before being given its current name by the IAU. It is otherwise a relatively isolated formation with only a few tiny satellite craters of Timocharis located nearby.

References

External links
 LTO-40B4 Heinrich — L&PI topographic map

Impact craters on the Moon
Mare Imbrium